Mikhail Nikolaevich Artemenkov (born November 7, 1978, in Smolensk) is a Russian historian and teacher. From 2017 to 2019, Artemenkov was the acting rector of Smolensk State University.

Early life 
Mikhail Nikolaevich Artemenkov was born in a family of builders. In 2000, Artemenkov graduated from Smolensk State University with a degree in history. In 2003, he completed his postgraduate studies at the same institution. In the same year, he defended his doctoral thesis on English foreign policy in the course of French religious wars. In 2006, he became a candidate of history.

In 2011, Artemenkov graduated from Saratov State Academy of Law with a degree in jurisprudence.

Career 
On May 11, 2017, Artemenkov became the acting rector of Smolensk State University. On September 27, 2019, Artemenkov was elected rector.

Academic work 
Artemenkov has written over 70 scientific and pedagogical works. He specializes in international relations of the early modern era, and the history of various penitentiary systems.

References

Russian historians
1978 births
Education in Russia
Living people